Nick Lee may refer to:

 Nick Lee (actor), Irish actor
 Nick Lee (cricketer) (born 1983), English cricketer

See also
 Nick Leeson, English former derivatives trader